James Peter Sanderson (born 29 June 1993) is a Gibraltarian swimmer.

Career
Sanderson first competed for Gibraltar at the 2010 Commonwealth Games in Delhi where he finished 23rd in the 400 metre freestyle in 4:22.41, 27th in the 100 metre butterfly in 1:01.42 and 29th in the 200 metre freestyle in 2:02.18.

At the 2010 FINA World Swimming Championships (25 m) in Dubai, Sanderson finished in 50th in the 200 metre individual medley in 2:15.03, 63rd in the 200 metre freestyle in 1:58.12, 75th in the 100 metre butterfly in 1:00.20, 86th in the 50 metre butterfly in 27.38 and 87th in the 100 metre freestyle in 54.35.

At the 2011 Island Games in the Isle of Wight, Sanderson finished 5th in the 400 metre freestyle in 4:13.39. 6th in the 100 metre butterfly in 59.46, 7th in the heats of the 50 metre butterfly in 27.35 (only the top six progressed to the final) and 8th in the heats of the 200 metre freestyle in 2:00.15. In the freestyle relays, Sanderson with Colin Bensadon, Oliver Quick and Wesley Warwick finished 6th in the 4 × 50 metre freestyle relay in 1:40.66, and with Bensadon, John Paul Llanelo and Quick finished 6th in the 4 × 100 relay in 3:41.83. In the medley relays, Sanderson teamed up with Bensadon, Jordan Gonzalez and Quick. They finished 7th in the heats of the 4 × 50 metre medley relay in 1:52.79 and finished 6th in the final of the 4 × 100 metre medley relay in 4:06.38.

Two months later at the 2011 Commonwealth Youth Games in the Isle of Man, Sanderson finished 12th in the 50 metre butterfly in 26.63, 13th in the 100 metre butterfly in 58.57, 15th in the 50 metre freestyle in 24.84, 16th in the 100 metre freestyle in 53.78 and 16th in the 200 metre freestyle in 1:56.39.

At the 2012 FINA World Swimming Championships (25 m) in Istanbul, Sanderson finished 64th in the 100 metre butterfly in 58.15, 73rd in the 50 metre butterfly in 26.31, 90th in the 50 metre freestyle in 24.37, 99th in the 100 metre freestyle in 53.93 and with Bensadon, Quick and Michael Hitchcock finished 16th in the 4 × 200 metre freestyle relay in 8:04.92.

At the 2013 Island Games in Bermuda, Sanderson set a national record in the heats of the 100 metre butterfly with his time of 57.16. He went on to finish 7th in the final posting a slightly slower time of 57.28. In other results, Sanderson finished 9th in the 50 metre freestyle in 24.24, 8th in the 50 metre butterfly in 26.22 and 11th in the 100 metre freestyle in 53.39. In the relays, Sanderson with Bensadon, Llanelo and Quick finished 7th in the 4 × 50 metre freestyle relay in 1:40.39 and with Bensadon, Hitchcock and Quick finished 7th in the 4 × 100 metre freestyle relay in 3:40.12. In the medley, Sanderson, Bensadon, Gonzalez and Quick together finished 6th in both the 4 × 50 and the 4 × 100 metre medley relays with times of 1:49.65 and 4:02.00 respectively.

References

1993 births
Living people
Gibraltarians
Gibraltarian male swimmers
Commonwealth Games swimmers for Gibraltar
Swimmers at the 2010 Commonwealth Games
Swimmers at the 2018 Commonwealth Games
Commonwealth Games competitors for Gibraltar